House is one of the restaurants at the Cliff House Hotel in Ardmore, County Waterford, Ireland. It is a fine dining restaurant that was awarded a Michelin star for each year in the period 2010 to present. Bridgestone Guides also lists the hotel as one of the 100 Best Places To Eat. Journalist Pol O Conghaile listed the hotel and restaurant on his The travel hot list 2010 in the Irish Independent.

The original Cliff House Hotel was established around 1932. In 2008, it was almost completely rebuilt. The restaurant was created during this rebuilding.

The first head chef of The House to earn a Michelin star was another Dutchman, Martijn Kajuiter. Kajuiter left the role in 2020. 

Chef Ian Doyle successfully maintained the Michelin star status of House for 2021 & 2022. Doyle left  in 2022 and was succeeded by Tony Parkin.

Awards
 Top Regional Member Award South 2008
 Georgina Campbell's "Newcomer of the Year 2009" award.
 Michelin star, 2010–present 
 Four AA Rosettes 2013–2018
 Hospitality Ireland Overall Winner for Best Hotel Restaurant 2019

See also
List of Michelin starred restaurants in Ireland

Notes

External links
 Ireland Guide
 House of the rising star
 Aces high

Michelin Guide starred restaurants in Ireland
Restaurants in County Waterford